Henry Cohn is an American mathematician.  He is a principal researcher at Microsoft Research and an adjunct professor at MIT.  In collaboration with Abhinav Kumar, Stephen D. Miller, Danylo Radchenko, and Maryna Viazovska, he solved the sphere packing problem in 24 dimensions.

Cohn graduated from Harvard University in 2000 with a doctorate in mathematics. Cohn was an Erdős Lecturer at Hebrew University of Jerusalem in 2008.  In 2016, he became a Fellow of the American Mathematical Society "for contributions to discrete mathematics, including applications to computer science and physics."  

In 2018, he was awarded the Levi L. Conant Prize for his article “A Conceptual Breakthrough in Sphere Packing,” published in 2017 in the Notices of the AMS.

References

External links
 

Year of birth missing (living people)
Living people
20th-century American mathematicians
21st-century American mathematicians
Fellows of the American Mathematical Society
Harvard Graduate School of Arts and Sciences alumni
Massachusetts Institute of Technology alumni
Microsoft Research people